Saint-Jean-de-Maurienne (also Saint-Jean de Maurienne - Vallée de l'Arvan) is a railway station located in Saint-Jean-de-Maurienne, Savoie, France. The station was opened on 20 October 1856 and is located on the Culoz–Modane railway. The train services are operated by SNCF.

Train services
The station is served by the following services:

High speed services (TGV) Paris - Chambéry - Turin - Milan
High speed services (TGV) Paris - Chambéry - Modane
Regional services (TER Auvergne-Rhône-Alpes) Chambéry - Modane

References

Railway stations in Savoie
Railway stations in France opened in 1856